This is a compilation list of all the notable Canadian male and female all-time ISU World Short Track Speed Skating Championships and Olympic medal list in short track speed skating competition.

Males

Females

* Incomplete data for Isabelle Charest, Sylvie Daigle, Nathalie Lambert.

References
Short Track Speed Skating Canada

Canada sport-related lists
Speed skating-related lists
Lists of sports medalists